Bonomyces is a genus of fungi in the family Biannulariaceae. Basidiocarps (fruit bodies) are agaricoid, similar to those of Clitocybe, but with a distinctly hard stipe (stem). The genus is separated on DNA characteristics as well as morphology. Species are known from  Europe, North Africa, and northern China.

References

Agaricales
Agaricales genera